There are 114 counties and one independent city in the U.S. State of Missouri. Following the Louisiana Purchase and the admittance of Louisiana into the United States in 1812, five counties were formed out of the Missouri Territory at the first general assembly: Cape Girardeau, New Madrid, Saint Charles, Saint Louis, and Ste. Genevieve. Most subsequent counties were apportioned from these five original counties. Six more counties were added through the 1836 Platte Purchase, the acquired lands of which formed the northwest tip of the state and consisted of Andrew, Atchison, Buchanan, Holt, Nodaway, and Platte counties.

In Missouri, the county level of government comes between those of the city and the state. Its primary responsibilities include maintaining roads, providing security, prosecuting criminals, and collecting taxes. Elected officials at this level include a sheriff, prosecuting attorney, and assessor.

Most of the counties in Missouri are named after politicians. One such county, Cass, was originally named Van Buren County after President Martin Van Buren, and was changed to its present name in support of Van Buren's Democratic opponent Lewis Cass during the presidential election of 1848. Other counties are named after war heroes, natural resources, explorers, and former U.S. territories.

The city of St. Louis is an independent city, and is not within the limits of a county. Its residents voted to secede from St. Louis County in 1876. Throughout the United States, St. Louis is one of three independent cities outside the state of Virginia (the other two are Baltimore, Maryland and Carson City, Nevada).

Population figures are based on the 2021 Census estimate. According to that census estimate, the population of Missouri is 6,168,187, an increase of 0.2% from 2020. The average population of Missouri's counties is 53,636; St. Louis County is the most populous (997,187), and Worth County is the least (1,983). The largest county is Texas County (1,179 sq mi, 3,054 km2) and the smallest is St. Louis city (61.9 sq mi, 160 km2). 

The Federal Information Processing Standard (FIPS) is used by the U.S. government to uniquely identify counties, and is provided for each entry. These codes link to the United States Census Bureau's "quick facts" for each county. To distinguish from counties in other states, one must use Missouri's FIPS code, 29. For example, Adair County's unique nationwide identifier is 29001.

Counties

|}

Former county names

See also
List of cities in Missouri
List of municipalities in Missouri
List of U.S. counties by population
Missouri census statistical areas
Demographics of Missouri

References

External links
 Missouri Association of Counties
 Digitized 1930 Plat Books of Missouri Counties from University of Missouri Division of Special Collections, Archives, and Rare Books

Missouri
 
Counties